François Roland Truffaut (6 February 1932 – 21 October 1984) was a French film director, screenwriter, producer, actor, and film critic. He is widely regarded as one of the founders of the French New Wave. After a career of more than 25 years, he remains an icon of the French film industry. 

Truffaut's film The 400 Blows (1959) is a defining film of the French New Wave movement, and has four sequels, Antoine et Colette (1962), Stolen Kisses (1968), Bed and Board (1970), and Love on the Run (1979). Truffaut's 1973 film Day for Night earned him critical acclaim and several awards, including the BAFTA Award for Best Film and the Academy Award for Best Foreign Language Film. His other notable films include Shoot the Piano Player (1960), Jules and Jim (1962), The Soft Skin (1964), The Wild Child (1970), Two English Girls (1971), The Last Metro (1980), and The Woman Next Door (1981). He is also known for his supporting role in Steven Spielberg's science fiction film Close Encounters of the Third Kind (1977).

Truffaut also wrote the notable book Hitchcock/Truffaut (1966), which detailed his interviews with the film director Alfred Hitchcock during the 1960s.

Early life 
Truffaut was born in Paris on 6 February 1932. His mother was Janine de Montferrand. His mother's future husband, Roland Truffaut, accepted him as an adopted son and gave him his surname. He was passed around to live with various nannies and his grandmother for a number of years. His grandmother instilled in him her love of books and music. He lived with her until her death, when Truffaut was eight years old. It was only after her death that he lived with his parents. Truffaut's biological father's identity is unknown, but a private detective agency in 1968 revealed that its inquiry into the matter led to a Roland Levy, a Jewish dentist from Bayonne. Truffaut's mother's family disputed the finding but Truffaut believed and embraced it.

Truffaut often stayed with friends and tried to be out of the house as much as possible. He knew Robert Lachenay from childhood, and they were lifelong best friends. Lachenay was the inspiration for the character René Bigey in The 400 Blows and worked as an assistant on some of Truffaut's films. Cinema offered Truffaut the greatest escape from an unsatisfying home life. He was eight years old when he saw his first movie, Abel Gance's Paradis Perdu (Paradise Lost, 1939), beginning his obsession. He frequently skipped school and sneaked into theaters because he lacked the money for admission. After being expelled from several schools, at age 14 he decided to become self-taught. Two of his academic goals were to watch three movies a day and read three books a week.

Truffaut frequented Henri Langlois's Cinémathèque Française, where he was exposed to countless foreign films, becoming familiar with American cinema and directors such as John Ford, Howard Hawks and Nicholas Ray, as well as those of British director Alfred Hitchcock.

Career

André Bazin
After starting his own film club in 1948, Truffaut met André Bazin, who had a great effect on his professional and personal life. Bazin was a critic and the head of another film society at the time. He became a personal friend of Truffaut's and helped him out of various financial and criminal situations during his formative years.

Truffaut joined the French Army in 1950, aged 18, but spent the next two years trying to escape. He was arrested for attempting to desert the army and incarcerated in military prison. Bazin used his political contacts to get Truffaut released and set him up with a job at his new film magazine, Cahiers du cinéma.

Cahiers du Cinéma
Over the next few years, Truffaut became a critic (and later editor) at Cahiers, where he became notorious for his brutal, unforgiving reviews. He was called "The Gravedigger of French Cinema" and was the only French critic not invited to the 1958 Cannes Film Festival. He supported Bazin in developing one of the most influential theories of cinema, the auteur theory.

In 1954, Truffaut wrote an article in Cahiers du cinéma, "Une Certaine Tendance du Cinéma Français" ("A Certain Trend of French Cinema"), in which he attacked the state of French films, lambasting certain screenwriters and producers, and listing eight directors he considered incapable of devising the kinds of "vile" and "grotesque" characters and storylines he called characteristic of the mainstream French film industry: Jean Renoir, Robert Bresson, Jean Cocteau, Jacques Becker, Abel Gance, Max Ophuls, Jacques Tati and Roger Leenhardt. The article caused a storm of controversy, and landed Truffaut an offer to write for the nationally circulated, more widely read cultural weekly Arts-Lettres-Spectacles. Truffaut wrote more than 500 film articles for that publication over the next four years.

Truffaut later devised the auteur theory, according to which the director was the "author" of his work and great directors such as Renoir or Hitchcock have distinct styles and themes that permeate their films. Although his theory was not widely accepted then, it gained some support in the 1960s from American critic Andrew Sarris. In 1967, Truffaut published his book-length interview of Hitchcock, Hitchcock/Truffaut (New York: Simon and Schuster).

Short films
After having been a critic, Truffaut decided to make films. He began with the short film Une Visite (1955) and followed it with Les Mistons (1957).

The 400 Blows
After seeing Orson Welles's Touch of Evil at the Expo 58, Truffaut made his feature film directorial debut with The 400 Blows (1959), which received considerable critical and commercial acclaim. He won the Best Director award at the 1959 Cannes Film Festival. The film follows the character of Antoine Doinel through his perilous misadventures in school, an unhappy home life and later reform school. The film is highly autobiographical. Both Truffaut and Doinel were only children of loveless marriages; they both committed petty crimes of theft and truancy from the military. Truffaut cast Jean-Pierre Léaud as Doinel. Léaud was seen as an ordinary boy of 14 who auditioned for the role after seeing a flyer, but interviews after the film's release (one is included on the Criterion DVD of the film) reveal Léaud's natural sophistication and an instinctive understanding of acting for the camera. Léaud and Truffaut collaborated on several films over the years. Their most noteworthy collaboration was the continuation of Doinel's story in a series of films called "The Antoine Doinel Cycle".

The primary focus of The 400 Blows is Doinel's life. The film follows him through his troubled adolescence. He is caught in between an unstable parental relationship and an isolated youth. From birth Truffaut was thrown into a troublesome situation. As he was born out of wedlock, his birth had to remain a secret because of the stigma of illegitimacy. He was registered as "a child born to an unknown father" in hospital records and looked after by a nurse for an extended period of time. His mother eventually married and her husband gave François his surname, Truffaut.

Although he was legally accepted as a legitimate child, his parents did not accept him. The Truffauts had another child, who died shortly after birth. This experience saddened them greatly and as a result they despised François because of the regret he represented (Knopf 4). He was an outcast from his earliest years, dismissed as an unwanted child. François was sent to live with his grandparents. When his grandmother died, his parents took him in, much to his mother's dismay. His experiences with his mother were harsh. He recalled being treated badly by her but found comfort in his father's laughter and spirit. François had a very depressing childhood after moving in with his parents. They left him alone when they took vacations. He even recalled being alone during Christmas. Being left alone forced François into independence, often doing various tasks around the house to improve it, such as painting or changing the electric outlets. Sadly, these kind gestures often resulted in catastrophic events, causing him to get scolded by his mother. His father mostly laughed them off.

The 400 Blows marked the beginning of the French New Wave movement, which gave directors such as Jean-Luc Godard, Claude Chabrol and Jacques Rivette a wider audience. The New Wave dealt with a self-conscious rejection of traditional cinema structure. This was a topic on which Truffaut had been writing for years.

Shoot the Piano Player

Following the success of The 400 Blows, Truffaut featured disjunctive editing and seemingly random voiceovers in his next film, Shoot the Piano Player (1960), starring Charles Aznavour. Truffaut has said that in the middle of filming, he realized that he hated gangsters. But since gangsters were a main part of the story, he toned up the comical aspect of the characters and made the movie more to his liking.

Even though Shoot the Piano Player was much appreciated by critics, it performed poorly at the box office. While the film focused on two of the French New Wave's favourite elements, American film noir and themselves, Truffaut never again experimented as heavily.

Jules and Jim and The Soft Skin

In 1962, Truffaut directed his third movie, Jules and Jim, a romantic drama starring Jeanne Moreau. The film was very popular and highly influential.

In 1963, Truffaut was approached to direct the American film Bonnie and Clyde, with a treatment written by Esquire journalists David Newman and Robert Benton intended to introduce the French New Wave to Hollywood. Although he was interested enough to help in script development, Truffaut ultimately declined, but not before interesting Jean-Luc Godard and American actor and would-be producer Warren Beatty, who proceeded with the film with director Arthur Penn.

The fourth movie Truffaut directed was The Soft Skin (1964). It was not acclaimed on its release.

Fahrenheit 451
Truffaut's first non-French film was a 1966 adaptation of Ray Bradbury's classic science fiction novel Fahrenheit 451, showcasing Truffaut's love of books. His only English-speaking film, made on location in England, was a great challenge for Truffaut, because he barely spoke English himself. Shot by cinematographer Nicolas Roeg, this was Truffaut's first film in colour. The larger-scale production was difficult for Truffaut, who had worked only with small crews and budgets. The shoot was also strained by a conflict with lead actor Oscar Werner, who was unhappy with his character and stormed off set, leaving Truffaut to shoot scenes using a body double shot from behind. The film was a commercial failure, and Truffaut never worked outside France again. The film's cult standing has steadily grown, although some critics remain dubious of it as an adaptation. A 2014 consideration of the film by Charles Silver praises it.

Thrillers and Stolen Kisses
Stolen Kisses (1968) was a continuation of the Antoine Doinel Cycle starring Claude Jade as Antoine's fiancée and later wife Christine Darbon. During its filming Truffaut fell in love with Jade and was briefly engaged to her. It was a big hit on the international art circuit. A short time later Jade made her Hollywood debut in Hitchcock's Topaz.

Truffaut worked on projects with varied subjects. The Bride Wore Black (1968), a brutal tale of revenge, is a stylish homage to the films of Alfred Hitchcock (once again starring Moreau). Mississippi Mermaid (1969), with Catherine Deneuve and Jean-Paul Belmondo, is an identity-bending romantic thriller. Both films are based on novels by Cornell Woolrich.

The Wild Child (1970) included Truffaut's acting debut in the lead role of 18th-century physician Jean Marc Gaspard Itard.

Doinel marries Christine

Bed and Board (1970) was another Antoine Doinel film, also with Jade, now Léaud's on-screen-wife.

Two English Girls (1971) is the female reflection of the same love story as "Jules et Jim". It is based on a story by Henri-Pierre Roché, who wrote Jules and Jim, about a man who falls equally in love with two sisters, and their love affair over a period of years.

Such a Gorgeous Kid Like Me (1972) was a screwball comedy that was not well received.

Day for Night
Day for Night won Truffaut a Best Foreign Film Oscar. The film is probably his most reflective work. It is the story of a film crew trying to finish a film while dealing with the personal and professional problems that accompany making a movie. Truffaut plays the director of the fictional film being made. This film features scenes from his previous films. It is considered his best film since his earliest work. Time magazine placed it on its list of 100 Best Films of the Century (along with The 400 Blows).

In 1975, Truffaut gained more notoriety with The Story of Adèle H.; Isabelle Adjani in the title role earned a nomination for an Academy Award for Best Actress. His 1976 film Small Change was nominated for the Golden Globe Award for Best Foreign Language Film.

The late 1970s and the last Doinel
The Man Who Loved Women (1977), a romantic drama, was a minor hit.

Truffaut also appeared in Steven Spielberg's 1977 Close Encounters of the Third Kind as scientist Claude Lacombe.

The Green Room (1978) starred Truffaut in the lead. It was a box-office flop, so he made Love on the Run (1979) starring Léaud and Jade as the final movie of the Doinel Cycle.

The Last Metro
One of Truffaut's final films gave him an international revival. The Last Metro (1980) garnered 12 César Award nominations and 10 wins, including Best Director.

Final films and legacy
Truffaut's last film was shot in black and white, giving his career a sense of having bookends. Confidentially Yours is Truffaut's tribute to his favourite director, Hitchcock. It deals with numerous Hitchcockian themes, such as private guilt versus public innocence, a woman investigating a murder, and anonymous locations.

A keen reader, Truffaut adapted many literary works, including two novels by Henri-Pierre Roché, Ray Bradbury's Fahrenheit 451, Henry James's "The Altar of the Dead", filmed as The Green Room, and several American detective novels.

Truffaut's other films were from original screenplays, often co-written by the screenwriters Suzanne Schiffman or Jean Gruault. They featured diverse subjects, the sombre The Story of Adèle H. inspired by the life of the daughter of Victor Hugo, with Isabelle Adjani; Day for Night, shot at the Victorine Studios, depicting the ups and downs of filmmaking; and The Last Metro, set during the German occupation of France during World War II, a film rewarded by ten César Awards.

Known as a lifelong cinephile, Truffaut once (according to the 1993 documentary film François Truffaut: Stolen Portraits) threw a hitchhiker out of his car after learning that he didn't like films.

Many filmmakers admire Truffaut, and tributes to his work have appeared in films such as Almost Famous, Face and The Diving Bell and the Butterfly, as well as novelist Haruki Murakami's Kafka on the Shore. In conversation with Michael Ondaatje, film editor Walter Murch mentions the influence Truffaut had on him as a young man, saying he was "electrified" by the freeze-frame at the end of The 400 Blows, and that Godard's Breathless and Truffaut's Shoot the Piano Player reinforced the idea that he could make films.

Roger Ebert included The 400 Blows in his canon of Great Movies, and concludes: "one of his most curious, haunting films is The Green Room (1978), based on the Henry James story 'The Altar of the Dead,' about a man and a woman who share a passion for remembering their dead loved ones. Jonathan Rosenbaum, who thinks The Green Room may be Truffaut's best film, told me he thinks of it as the director's homage to the auteur theory. That theory, created by Bazin and his disciples (Truffaut, Godard, Resnais, Chabrol, Rohmer, Malle), declared that the director was the true author of a film—not the studio, the screenwriter, the star, the genre. If the figures in the green room stand for the great directors of the past, perhaps there is a shrine there now to Truffaut. One likes to think of the ghost of Antoine Doinel lighting a candle before it."

Commentary of other filmmakers 
Truffaut expressed his admiration for filmmakers such as Luis Buñuel, Ingmar Bergman, Robert Bresson, Roberto Rossellini, and Alfred Hitchcock. He wrote Hitchcock/Truffaut, a book about Hitchcock, based on a lengthy series of interviews.

Of Jean Renoir, he said: "I think Renoir is the only filmmaker who's practically infallible, who has never made a mistake on film. And I think if he never made mistakes, it's because he always found solutions based on simplicity—human solutions. He's one film director who never pretended. He never tried to have a style, and if you know his work—which is very comprehensive, since he dealt with all sorts of subjects—when you get stuck, especially as a young filmmaker, you can think of how Renoir would have handled the situation, and you generally find a solution".

Truffaut called German filmmaker Werner Herzog "the most important film director alive."

Truffaut and Jean-Luc Godard, his colleague from Les Cahiers du Cinéma, worked together closely during their start as film directors although they had different working methods. Tensions came to the surface after May 68: Godard wanted a more political, specifically Marxist cinema, Truffaut was critical of creating films for primarily political purposes. In 1973, Godard wrote Truffaut a lengthy and raucous private letter peppered with accusations and insinuations, several times stating that as a filmmaker "you're a liar" and that his latest film (Day for Night) had been unsatisfying, lying and evasive: "You're a liar, because the scene between you and Jacqueline Bisset last week at Francis [a Paris restaurant] isn't included in your movie, and one also can't help wondering why the director is the only guy who isn't sleeping around in Day for Night" (Truffaut directed the film, wrote it and played the director on the film set in the film). Godard also implied that Truffaut had gone commercial and easy.

Truffaut replied with an angry 20-page letter in which he accused Godard of being a radical-chic hypocrite, a man who believed everyone to be "equal" in theory only. "The Ursula Andress of militancy—like Brando—a piece of shit on a pedestal." Godard later tried to reconcile with Truffaut, but they never spoke to or saw each other again. After Truffaut's death, Godard wrote the introduction to a generous selection of his correspondence, and included his own 1973 letter. He also offered a long tribute in his film Histoire(s) du cinéma.

Personal life 
Truffaut was married to Madeleine Morgenstern from 1957 to 1965, and they had two daughters, Laura (born 1959) and Eva (born 1961). Madeleine was the daughter of Ignace Morgenstern, managing director of one of France's largest film distribution companies, Cocinor, and was largely responsible for securing funding for Truffaut's first films.

In 1968 Truffaut was engaged to actress Claude Jade (Stolen Kisses, Bed and Board, Love on the Run); he and Fanny Ardant (The Woman Next Door, Confidentially Yours) lived together from 1981 to 1984 and had a daughter, Joséphine Truffaut (born 28 September 1983).

Truffaut was an atheist, but had great respect for the Catholic Church and requested a Requiem Mass for his funeral.

Death 

In July 1983, following his first stroke and being diagnosed with a brain tumour, Truffaut rented France Gall's and Michel Berger's house outside Honfleur, Normandy. He was expected to attend his friend Miloš Forman's Amadeus premiere when he died on 21 October 1984, aged 52, at the American Hospital of Paris in Neuilly-sur-Seine in France.

At the time of his death, he had numerous films in preparation. He had intended to make 30 films and then retire to write books for the remainder of his life. He was five films short of that aim. He is buried in Montmartre Cemetery.

Filmography

Director

Feature films

Shorts films and collaborations

Screenwriter only

Actor

Producer only

Bibliography 
 Les 400 Coups (1960) with M. Moussy (English translation: The 400 Blows)
 Le Cinéma selon Alfred Hitchcock (1967, second edition 1983) (English translation: Hitchcock and Hitchcock/Truffaut with the collaboration of Helen G. Scott)
 Les Aventures d'Antoine Doinel (1970) (English translation: Adventures of Antoine Doinel; translated by Helen G. Scott)
 Jules et Jim (film script) (1971) (English translation: Jules and Jim; translated by Nicholas Fry)
 La Nuit américaine et le Journal de Fahrenheit 451 (1974)
 Le Plaisir des yeux (1975)
 L'Argent de poche (1976) (English title: Small Change: A Film Novel; translated by Anselm Hollo)
 L'Homme qui aimait les femmes (1977)
 Les Films de ma vie (1981) (English translation: The Films in My Life, translated by Leonard Mayhew)
  (1988) (English translation: Correspondence, 1945–1984; translated by Gilbert Adair, released posthumously)
 Le Cinéma selon François Truffaut (1988) edited by Anne Gillain (released posthumously)
 Belle époque (1996) with Jean Gruault (released posthumously)

See also
 François Truffaut Award
 Paris Belongs to Us
 Two in the Wave, a 2010 documentary film about Truffaut's relationship with Jean-Luc Godard
 La Cinémathèque Française will offer a full retrospective and an exhibition of François Truffaut's work in 2014 / 2015

References

External links 

 
 New Wave Film Encyclopedia: "François Truffaut" an extensive biography
 François Truffaut complete biography: "François Truffaut" 
 François Truffaut bibliography via the UC Berkeley Media Resources Center
 Francois Truffaut at The Guardian Film
 Francois Truffaut at The New York Times Movies
 
 
 Legendary interview with Truffaut from 1970
 AllMovie.com Biography

1932 births
1984 deaths
Male actors from Paris
Directors of Best Foreign Language Film Academy Award winners
Best Director BAFTA Award winners
Best Director César Award winners
Cannes Film Festival Award for Best Director winners
Burials at Montmartre Cemetery
Deaths from cancer in France
Deaths from brain tumor
Film theorists
French atheists
French male film actors
French film critics
French film directors
French film historians
French film producers
French male screenwriters
20th-century French male actors
20th-century French historians
20th-century French screenwriters